The Fellowship of Fundamental Bible Churches (FFBC) is a fellowship of independent, autonomous, fundament churches established in 1939. It is considered only a fellowship of like-minded churches, rather than a denomination. Local congregations in the fellowship have no financial obligations to the fellowship, and the fellowship exercises no control over them. It is only expected that the churches believe and teach theology that is consistent with the Fundamentals of the Faith.

The church originated in a split from the Methodist Protestant Church, which was in merger talks with the Methodist Episcopal Church and the Methodist Episcopal Church, South. Shortly before almost all of the Methodist Protestant Church joined the two Methodist Episcopal bodies to form The Methodist Church, the more conservative churches in the Methodist Protestant Church's Eastern Conference reorganized as the Bible Protestant Church. It took its current name in 1985.

Doctrinally, the FFBC professes to hold these distinctives: "Biblically literal in our interpretation; dispensational (not covenantal) in our theology; premillennial and pretribulational in our eschatology; evangelistic and missions-oriented in our outreach; Biblically separated in personal life and ecclesiastical associations, and baptistic with regard to the mode and subjects of baptism." They also oppose the Pentecostal and Charismatic movements, holding that spiritual gifts such as speaking in tongues were sign gifts that ceased to operate after the close of the New Testament canon.

Currently (2018), the FFBC comprises 18 churches spread out over New Jersey, Pennsylvania, New York, Michigan, and California. The fellowship operates the Tri-State Bible Camp & Conference Center in Montague, New Jersey. Most churches in the fellowship are either "Bible Churches" or "Baptist Churches". The Fellowship of Fundamental Bible Churches is a member of the American Council of Christian Churches.

External links
Official Web Site

Fundamentalist denominations
Christian organizations established in 1939
1939 establishments in the United States